The 2012–13 Liga Nacional de Básquet season was the 29th season of the top professional basketball league in Argentina. The regular season started on 14 September 2012. Regatas Corrientes won their first title, defeating Lanús in the finals.

Promotions and relegations
Torneo Nacional de Ascenso Champions from the previous season Unión Progresista and runners-up Argentino de Junín were promoted, occupying the berths left by Quilmes and San Martín de Corrientes. Unión Progresista would be relegated at the end of the season, together with 9 de Julio de Río Tercero.

Clubs

Regular season

First stage
The first stage took place between 14 September and 28 October 2012. Teams were divided into two zones. The top four teams from each zone competed in the Torneo Súper 8 that took place in November.

North Zone

South Zone

Torneo Súper 8
The eighth edition of Torneo Súper 8 took place on 7–10 November 2012 in the city of Corrientes, Corrientes. Regatas Corrientes won their second title, defeating Quimsa in the Final, and were granted a berth in the 2013 Liga Sudamericana de Básquetbol.

Second stage
The second stage started on 1 November 2013. All 16 teams were ranked together. Each team carried over half of the points obtained in the first stage.

Playoffs

Championship playoffs
The Playoffs started on 13 March 2013 and ended on 15 May 2013. Regatas Corrientes defeated Lanús in the Finals and won their first title. Both teams were qualified for the 2014 FIBA Americas League. Since Regatas Corrientes had also qualified to the 2013 Liga Sudamericana de Básquetbol after winning the Torneo Súper 8, their berth was given to the next best team that was not qualified yet, in this case Argentino de Junín.

Relegation playoffs
The relegation series began on 14 March. Unión Progresista and 9 de Julio de Río Tercero lost their respective series and were relegated to the Torneo Nacional de Ascenso.

Clubs in international competitions

Awards

Yearly Awards
Most Valuable Player: Paolo Quinteros, Regatas Corrientes
Best Foreign Player:  Darren Phillip, Unión Progresista
Sixth Man of the Year: Nicolás Romano, Regatas Corrientes
Rookie of the Year: Federico Van Lacke, Boca Juniors
Coach of the Year: Adrián Capelli, Argentino de Junín
Most Improved Player: Adrián Boccia, Lanús
All-Tournament Team:
 F John de Groat, Boca Juniors
 F Marcos Mata, Peñarol
 C Daniel Santiago, Boca Juniors
 G Facundo Campazzo, Peñarol
 G Paolo Quinteros, Regatas Corrientes

References

Guía Oficial 2016/2017, laliganacional.com.ar. Retrieved 16 May 2017.

Liga Nacional de Básquet seasons
   
Argentina